is  the associate coach of the Shimane Susanoo Magic in the Japanese B.League.

Head coaching record

|- 
| style="text-align:left;"|Hamamatsu Higashimikawa Phoenix
| style="text-align:left;"|2011-12
| 52||37||15|||| style="text-align:center;"|1st in Eastern|||5||3||2||
| style="text-align:center;"|Eastern Champions
|-
| style="text-align:left;"|Hamamatsu Higashimikawa Phoenix
| style="text-align:left;"|2012-13
| 38||23||15|||| style="text-align:center;"|Fired|||-||-||-||
| style="text-align:center;"|-
|-
| style="text-align:left;"|Shinshu Brave Warriors
| style="text-align:left;"|2013-14
| 52||33||19|||| style="text-align:center;"|4th in Eastern|||3||1||2||
| style="text-align:center;"|Lost in 1st round
|-
| style="text-align:left;"|Shinshu Brave Warriors
| style="text-align:left;"|2014-15
| 52||19||33|||| style="text-align:center;"|9th in Eastern|||-||-||-||
| style="text-align:center;"|-
|-
| style="text-align:left;"|Oita Ehime Heat Devils
| style="text-align:left;"|2016
| 26||10||16|||| style="text-align:center;"|10th in Western|||-||-||-||
| style="text-align:center;"|-
|-
| style="text-align:left;"|Ehime Orange Vikings
| style="text-align:left;"|2016-17
| 60||29||31|||| style="text-align:center;"|4th in B2 Western|||-||-||-||
| style="text-align:center;"|-
|-
|- style="background:#FDE910;"
| style="text-align:left;"|Rizing Zephyr Fukuoka
| style="text-align:left;"|2017-18
| 60||47||13|||| style="text-align:center;"| 1st in B2 Western|||5||4||1||
| style="text-align:center;"|B2 Champions
|-
| style="text-align:left;"|Rizing Zephyr Fukuoka
| style="text-align:left;"|2018-19
| 7||0||7|||| style="text-align:center;"| Fired|||||||||
| 
|-
| style="text-align:left;"|Yamagata Wyverns
| style="text-align:left;"|2019-20
| 21||4||17|||| style="text-align:center;"| Fired|||||||||
| 
|-
| style="text-align:left;"|Shimane Susanoo Magic
| style="text-align:left;"|2019-20
| 11||1||10|||| style="text-align:center;"| 6th in Western|||||||||
| 
|-

References

1975 births
Living people
Ehime Orange Vikings coaches
Japanese basketball coaches
Passlab Yamagata Wyverns coaches
Rizing Zephyr Fukuoka coaches
San-en NeoPhoenix coaches
San-en NeoPhoenix players
Shimane Susanoo Magic coaches
Shinshu Brave Warriors coaches
People from Toyohashi